Veal Milanese, or veal alla Milanese, is an Italian dish in Milanese Lombard cuisine, and a popular variety of cotoletta. It is traditionally prepared with a veal rib chop or sirloin bone-in and made into a breaded cutlet, fried in butter. Due to its shape, it is often called oreggia d'elefant in Milanese or orecchia d'elefante in Italian, meaning elephant's ear.

A common variation made with chicken is popular in the United States and other English-speaking countries and bears the name "chicken Milanese" (Italian ). Other various breaded meat dishes prepared in South America were inspired by the cotoletta alla milanese and are known as milanesa. Another variation of milanesa in the same region is called a la napolitana and is made similar to the cotoletta alla milanese with a preparation of cheese and tomato.

History 
In Milan, the dish dates to at least 1134, where it is mentioned at a banquet for the canon of Milan's St. Ambrogio Cathedral. Further evidence dates to around the 1st century BC indicating that the Romans enjoyed dishes of thin sliced meat, which was breaded and fried. The dish resembles the Austrian dish Wiener Schnitzel, which originated in Austria around the 19th century.

See also 
 List of veal dishes
 List of Italian dishes
 Scaloppine

References 

Cuisine of Lombardy
Italian cuisine
Veal dishes